Tagetes subvillosa is a Mexican species of marigold in the family Asteraceae. It has been found only in southern Mexico.

Tagetes subvillosa is a branching annual herb up to 60 cm (2 feet) tall. Leaves are pinnately compound up to 6 cm (2.4 inches) long. The plant will produce several flower heads in a flat-topped array, orange, each head containing ray florets surrounding numerous disc florets.

References

External links

subvillosa
Endemic flora of Mexico
Plants described in 1816
Taxa named by Mariano Lagasca